Charlie Ondras was an American drummer from New York and a founding member of the noise rock band Unsane, formerly Lawn-Chair-Blisters. He also collaborated with Jon Spencer and Cristina Martinez under the name Boss Hog and appeared on the band's first two releases. Ondras died of a heroin overdose while attending the 1992 New Music Seminar in New York.

Discography
Boss Hog

Unsane

References

1966 births
1992 deaths
American rock drummers
Boss Hog members
American noise musicians
Unsane members
Deaths by heroin overdose in New York (state)
20th-century American drummers
American male drummers
20th-century American male musicians
Drug-related deaths in New York City